is a multimedia kids project by Aniplex and Sony Music Entertainment Japan. A manga adaptation began serialization on Shogakukan's Mebae magazine on April 1, 2020. An original anime television series produced by CloverWorks began airing from April 2020.

Plot
Carl is a red sports car working as a delivery worker in the Mobile Land island. During his deliveries, he obeys traffic rules and meets all kinds of friends.

Characters

Media

Manga
A manga adaptation began on Shogakukan's Mebae magazine from April 1, 2020.

Anime
Aniplex and Sony Music Entertainment Japan announced the TV series on March 3, 2020. It is directed by Shinobu Sasaki and produced by Taito Itō, with Toshiya Ono writing the scripts. Himu Ashitazu drafts the original character designs, with Hiromi Ogata adapting those character designs for animation. Cher Watanabe is composing the series' music, while Kisuke Koizumi is the sound director. The series is animated by CloverWorks and premiered on the NHK's education channel from April 2, 2020.

Home media
A DVD entitled Car-kun no Nakama-tachi (カークンのなかまたち, lit. Car-kun's Group of Friends), containing 10 select episodes, will be released by Aniplex in Japan on November 25, 2020.

Notes

References

External links
 
 

Anime with original screenplays
Aniplex
CloverWorks
Japanese children's animated comedy television series
NHK original programming
Shogakukan manga